John Jay Osborn Jr. (August 5, 1945 – October 19, 2022) was an American author, lawyer and legal academic.  He is best known for his bestselling novel The Paper Chase published in 1971.

Early life
Osborn was born in Boston on August 5, 1945.  His father, John Jay Sr., was a doctor at Stanford University School of Medicine; his mother was Anne (née Kidder).  He was a descendant of both John Jay, the first Chief Justice of the United States, and of railroad baron Cornelius Vanderbilt.  His family relocated to the Bay Area when Osborn was nine.  He received a Bachelor of Arts in American History from Harvard University in 1967 and graduated with a Juris Doctor from Harvard Law School in 1970.  He also did graduate work at Yale Law School.

Career
After graduating from law school, Osborn clerked for Judge Max Rosenn of the United States Court of Appeals for the Third Circuit from 1970 to 1972.  He was later an associate attorney with the firm Patterson Belknap Webb & Tyler.  Osborn taught law at the University of Miami, the Benjamin N. Cardozo School of Law at Yeshiva University, the UC Berkeley School of Law, and the University of San Francisco School of Law, from which he retired in 2018.

For his third-year writing project at Harvard Law, Osborn wrote The Paper Chase, a fictional account of one Harvard Law School student's battles with the imperious Professor Charles Kingsfield.  Osborn found a publisher with the assistance of William Alfred and the book was released in 1971.  It was made into a film two years later, starring John Houseman and Timothy Bottoms.  Houseman won an Academy Award for Best Supporting Actor for his performance as contracts professor Kingsfield.  The Paper Chase also became a television series, and Osborn wrote several of the scripts.

Osborn's third novel, The Associates, was adapted into a short-lived television series starring Martin Short and Wilfrid Hyde-White.  He was also one of the writers (along with Thomas A. Cohen) of the screenplay for the 2010 film version of the 1983 novel The River Why by David James Duncan.  His final book, Listen to the Marriage, was published in 2018.

Personal life
Osborn married Emilie Heffron Sisson in 1968.  She was a Radcliffe College graduate who worked as a physician with the Palo Alto Medical Foundation, and they remained married until his death.  Together, they had three children, Sam, Meredith (who also attended Harvard College and Harvard Law School) and Shef.

Osborn died on October 19, 2022, at his home in San Francisco. He was 77 years old and suffered from squamous cell cancer prior to his death.

Publications 
Novels
 The Paper Chase (1971)
 The Only Thing I've Done Wrong (1977) 
 The Associates (1979) 
 The Man Who Owned New York (1981) 
 Listen to the Marriage (2018)

Scripts
 The Paper Chase (15 of 54 episodes, 1978–1986)
 "The Man Who Would Be King" (1978)
 "A Day in the Life of..." (1978)
 "Moot Court" (1978)
 "The Sorcerer's Apprentice" (1978)
 "Scavenger Hunt" (1979)
 "Outline Fever" (1983)
 "Birthday Party" (1983)
 "Plague of Locusts" (1983)
 "Snow" (1983)
 "Mrs. Hart" (1984)
 "War of the Wonks" (1984)
 "Billy Pierce" (1984) (teleplay only)
 "Decisions: Part 1" (1985)
 "Decisions: Part 2" (1985)
 "Honor" (1986)
 L.A. Law (1 episode, 1986–1994)
 "December Bribe" (1987)
 Spenser: For Hire (1 episode, 1985–1988)
 "Substantial Justice" (1988)
 The River Why (2010, with Thomas A. Cohen)

References

External links
 

1945 births
2022 deaths
Deaths from squamous cell carcinoma of skin
Harvard Law School alumni
University of Miami faculty
University of San Francisco faculty
Yale University faculty
Yeshiva University faculty
American male novelists
20th-century American novelists
20th-century American male writers
Patterson Belknap Webb & Tyler people
Novelists from Florida
Novelists from Connecticut
Novelists from New York (state)
Yale Law School alumni
Writers from Boston
John Jay
Vanderbilt family
Deaths from cancer in California